The 2000 Sanex Trophy was a women's tennis tournament played on outdoor clay courts in Knokke-Heist, Belgium that was part of the Tier IV category of the 2000 WTA Tour. It was the second edition of the tournament and was held from 17 July until 23 July 2000. Sixth-seeded Anna Smashnova won the singles title and earned $16,000 first-prize money.

Finals

Singles

 Anna Smashnova defeated  Dominique van Roost, 6–2, 7–5
 It was Smashnova's 1st WTA singles title of the year and the 2nd of her career.

Doubles

 Giulia Casoni /  Iroda Tulyaganova defeated  Catherine Barclay /  Eva Dyrberg, 2–6, 6–4, 6–4

References

External links
 ITF tournament edition details
 Tournament draws

Knokke-Heist
WTA Knokke-Heist
2000 in Belgian tennis